Cyrtophora cicatrosa, commonly known as the garden tent-web spider or dome spider, is a common species of orb-weavers found in many parts of Asia. It is common in gardens and has a very dense, thick, three dimensional and strong tent-like web.

Description 

It is a small spider, which has long legs and a green colour with yellowish markings. It can turn black with white and green markings when flushed. It is often seen upside down. Its web is very strong but lacks sticky fibers. It is built in a three-dimensional and complex dome commonly found between branches of thorny plants, but can be seen basically anywhere. Hence, they do not move very much from the centre of the dome in which they hang upside-down. The dome is connected by many lines to a support, and forms a mountain shape in the middle. A chain of green bean-like egg sacs is also a common sight in these webs.

References 

Spiders of Asia
cicatrosa
Spiders described in 1869